Jonathan Mendelsohn may refer to:

 Jonathan Mendelsohn (singer) (born 1980), American singer 
 Jonathan Mendelsohn, Baron Mendelsohn (born 1966), British lobbyist